The Northeast Mississippi Community College Tigers are 8 teams representing Northeast Mississippi Community College in intercollegiate athletics, including men and women's basketball and tennis. Men's sports include baseball, football, and golf. Women's sports include softball. The Tigers compete in the NJCAA Region XXIII and are members of the Mississippi Association of Community & Junior Colleges.

Teams

Baseball
Northeast Mississippi has had 1 Major League Baseball Draft selection since the draft began in 1965.

Basketball

Shaq Buchanan played basketball for the school in 2015-17.

References

External links
 

College sports teams in Mississippi